The Fokker E.III was the main variant of the Eindecker (literally meaning "one deck") fighter aircraft of World War I. It entered service on the Western Front in December 1915 and was also supplied to Austria-Hungary and Turkey.

Design and development
The E.III was basically an E.II fitted with larger, newly designed wings that had a slightly narrower chord of 1.80 meter (70-7/8 in), compared to 1.88 meter (74 in) on the earlier Eindeckers, going back to Fokker's original M.5 monoplane aircraft. The E.III retained the same 75 kW (100 hp) Oberursel U.I engine, and therefore also used the larger diameter "horseshoe" pattern cowling that also mandated the inclusion of the E.II's soffit-like extensions to the sides of the upper nose sheet metalwork, but had a larger 81 L (21.5 gal) drum-shaped main fuel tank just behind the cockpit, which increased the Eindeckers endurance to about 2½ hours; an hour more than the E.II. Most E.IIIs were armed with a single 7.92 mm (.312 in) Spandau LMG 08 machine gun with 500 rounds of ammunition; however, after the failure of the twin-gun Fokker E.IV as a viable successor, some E.IIIs were fitted with twin guns.

Fokker production figures state that 249 E.IIIs were manufactured; however, a number of the 49 E.IIs were upgraded to E.III standard when they were returned to Fokker's Schwerin factory for repairs.

Operational history

The E.III was the first type to arrive in sufficient numbers to form small specialist fighter units, Kampfeinsitzer Kommandos (KEK) in early 1916. Previously, Eindeckers had been allocated singly, just as the E.I and E.II had been, to the front-line Feldflieger Abteilungen that carried out reconnaissance duties. On 10 August 1916, the first German Jagdstaffeln (single-seat fighter squadrons) were formed, initially equipped with various early fighter types, including a few E.IIIs, which were by then outmoded and being replaced by more modern fighters. Standardisation in the Jagdstaffeln (and any real success) had to wait for the availability in numbers of the Albatros D.I and Albatros D.II in early 1917.

Turkish E.IIIs were based at Beersheba in Palestine while others operated in Mesopotamia during the Siege of Kut-al-Amara.

Surviving aircraft

The only known surviving original Eindecker, bearing IdFlieg serial number 210/16, was brought down in the Somme area in 1916 by the British and then evaluated by the War Office until it was transferred to the London Science Museum in 1918. It is currently on display fully assembled, but with its fabric covering removed to illustrate its internal construction.

Operators

Kaiserliche und Königliche Luftfahrtruppen
Kaiserliche und Königliche Kriegsmarine

Bulgarian Air Force

Luftstreitkräfte
Kaiserliche Marine
Marine-Fliegerabteilung 

Ottoman aviation squadrons were supplied with 22 E.III aircraft.

Specifications (E.III)

See also

References

Bibliography

Further reading

External links 

 Fokker E.III 634 made 1915

E.III
1910s German fighter aircraft
Military aircraft of World War I
Single-engined tractor aircraft
Mid-wing aircraft
Aircraft first flown in 1915
Rotary-engined aircraft